Teemu Sainomaa (born May 15, 1981) is a Finnish former professional ice hockey centre.  He played in the SM-liiga for Jokerit and Pelicans. He was drafted 62nd overall in the 1999 NHL Entry Draft by the Ottawa Senators.

External links

1981 births
Living people
Finnish ice hockey centres
Jokerit players
Ottawa Senators draft picks
Lahti Pelicans players
Ice hockey people from Helsinki